f(g) Scholar also known as fg Scholar was a graphing, spreadsheet, and calculator software package published by Future Graph, Inc. The software received a number of awards as well as extensive press coverage. Although originally targeted towards technical academia in the fields of math, science, and engineering primarily college students and teachers, the software did gain acceptance in the business world.

fg Scholar featured a calculator, its own programming language with macro support, the ability to import graphics, an automated formula builder, math templates, a spreadsheet with graphing capability, a full featured vector drawing module, and the ability to export files in a number of formats.

Features
f(g) Scholar provided 12 types of charts including: bar, pie, area, three-dimensional area.

f(g) Scholar supported the following graphic types: .WPG, .WMF, .CLP, .CGM, and .PIC.

References

Bibliography

Further reading

External links
 F(g) Scholar Diskette, Amazon

Mathematical software
Spreadsheet software